The Ralph Thornton Community Centre is a community centre that forms the centre of the Leslieville/South Riverdale neighbourhood of Toronto, Canada. The neoclassical heritage structure was originally built by the federal government to house Postal Station G. Designed by one of Toronto's most noted architects E.J. Lennox, it opened in 1913. In 1979 it was leased to the city and converted into a community centre. The building today is home to the Queen/Saulter branch of the Toronto Public Library, a day care, and has offices for some 30 community organizations. It is named after Ralph Thornton, a taxi driver and prominent community activist in the Riverdale area.

External links
Official site

Community centres in Canada
Municipal buildings in Toronto